Teddyson John, M.B.E, better known as Teddy or TJ, is a Saint Lucian brand ambassador, singer and songwriter. He is also a keyboardist and percussionist. John was Saint Lucia's first artist to win and be nominated for an International Reggae and World Music Award.

Early life 
John was born in a Christian family where his mom and dad were not musically inclined but some of his brothers were. However, John started singing and performing in church which would manifest in his days at the Sir Ira Simmons Secondary School. His first recording before he entered the Soca industry in 2007 was a gospel song entitled "Sweeter".

Early career 
Before John rose to fame he served in the hospitality industry. John worked at St Lucia Sandals Resort as an Entertainment Manager.

Honors, Awards and nominations 
In 2017 John became 1 of 12 Saint Lucians to be a part of Her Majesty's Birthday Honours. John received the honour of the Most Excellent Order of the British Empire M.B.E .

 -  - Most Excellent Order of the British Empire – M.B.E, of the British Empire (2017)

Discography

Albums

References 

Living people
People from Castries Quarter
Saint Lucian male singers
Soca musicians
Year of birth missing (living people)